In the Jungle Groove is a compilation album by American funk musician James Brown, released in August 1986 by Polydor Records.

Background 
Originally issued to capitalize on the popularity of Brown's music in hip hop circles at the time, it includes the first album release of the much-sampled single "Funky Drummer" (1969), along with a selection of previously unreleased tracks, alternate takes, and remixes. The original recordings were produced by Brown, while the reissue was produced by Cliff White and Tim Rogers. A similar follow-up compilation, Motherlode, was released in 1988.

The album's title is taken from a song Brown recorded in the studio in August 1970. The full recording of the song "In the Jungle Groove" remains unissued; however, on the album its introduction is appended to the beginning of "I Got to Move", another previously unreleased song recorded at the same session. A remastered and expanded 2003 reissue of In the Jungle Groove added a bonus track, an extended version of "Blind Man Can See It" from the Black Caesar soundtrack album.

Critical reception 

In a contemporary review, Richard Hallman of The Atlanta Journal-Constitution recommended the album to "connoisseurs and collectors", and said that it "should be considered for purchase only by those who take their Godfather very seriously." Ken Tucker, writing in the Chicago Tribune, commended Polygram for their "admirable project of re-releasing the fascinating music Brown made during the late '60s and early 1970s, when he disappeared from the pop charts to record much of his most profoundly funky music." He cited Clyde Stubblefield's performance on "Funky Drummer" as the highlight and said that the album "serves to remind the listener that, in addition to his greatness as a singer and a rhythmic innovator, Brown is also an exceptional band leader." In the Jungle Groove was voted as the fourth best reissue of 1986 in The Village Voices annual Pazz & Jop critics' poll. The newspaper's Robert Christgau called it "long-promised, worth-waiting for, full-length, '69-'71 dance classics", while ranking it as the eighth best reissue of 1986.

In a retrospective article for Rolling Stone, Christgau said that, because most of the "renowned" album is available on Star Time (1991), In the Jungle Groove is "for serious students only", even though "Brown is the rare artist who improves with length." Douglas Wolk, writing for Wondering Sound, said that it "inspired a million hip-hop samples" and featured "blisteringly intense funk workouts" from a period when Brown and his 1970–71 band were "making some of the greatest dance records of that era." In 2000, Vibe magazine included it on their list of the 100 essential albums of the 20th century. In 2003, Rolling Stone ranked it number 330 on their list of the 500 greatest albums of all time, and 329 in the 2012 revised list. In a review of the album's reissue, Brian James from PopMatters felt that In the Jungle Groove deserves a re-release "because the music earns it. Its origins as a quickie cash-in don’t detract from the undeniable power of the grooves unleashed within, nor are the proceedings hurt by the revolving-door lineup of the period." James argued that it showcases Brown's sidemen, who "forged into a mold that was [his] stunning creation", and recommended it to listeners who are interested in Brown or funk music.

Track listing

Personnel 
Credits for In the Jungle Groove adapted from liner notes.

See also 
 Motherlode (James Brown album)

References

Bibliography

External links
 
 Reissue press release at Goliath

James Brown compilation albums
1986 compilation albums
Polydor Records compilation albums